The discography of Swedish pop duo Roxette consists of ten studio albums (including six Swedish number ones), one live album, thirteen compilation albums, one remix album, eleven video albums, three box sets, fifty-six singles (including three Swedish and four US number ones) and twenty promotional singles, as well as fifty-two music videos. The duo, which consisted of Per Gessle and Marie Fredriksson, are the second most commercially successful Swedish act of all time, after ABBA. They sold over 75 million records worldwide, although a report by the Los Angeles Times put the figure as high as 80 million. The RIAA awarded them certifications of 3.5 million units in the US, where the duo have sold over two million albums since Nielsen SoundScan began tracking sales data in May 1991. The BPI in the UK certified Roxette for shipments of at least 2.2 million. They were particularly successful in Germany, where they are recognised as one of the highest-certified acts of all time, with shipments of 5.725 million units.

The duo formed in 1986, releasing debut album Pearls of Passion that same year. The record and its singles performed well in Sweden, but failed to chart elsewhere. Their international breakthrough came with Look Sharp! in 1988, which contained "The Look" and "Listen to Your Heart". Both songs peaked at number one on the Billboard Hot 100, while "Dangerous" peaked at number two. Originally a non-album single in 1987, "It Must Have Been Love" became an international hit when it was re-released in 1990 as part of the soundtrack to Pretty Woman. Their most successful album, Joyride, was issued the following year, eventually selling over 11 million copies worldwide. The title track was their fourth number one on the Billboard Hot 100, with "Fading Like a Flower (Every Time You Leave)" also peaking at number two.

Roxette's fourth studio album Tourism was recorded in multiple studios during the "Join the Joyride! Tour", which saw them performing to over 1.7 million people worldwide. The record performed well internationally, selling six million copies worldwide, but failed to replicate the success of previous albums in North America. 1994's Crash! Boom! Bang! was followed by greatest hits collection Don't Bore Us, Get to the Chorus! in 1995, which both sold in excess of five million copies worldwide. A compilation of Spanish-language re-recordings titled Baladas en Español was issued in Spanish-speaking territories in 1996. Studio albums Have a Nice Day and Room Service were released in 1999 and 2001, respectively, and were both commercially successful throughout Europe. 

Fredriksson was diagnosed with a brain tumour in 2002, resulting in a period of inactivity for the duo. They briefly reunited to record two new songs for A Collection of Roxette Hits: Their 20 Greatest Songs! in 2006, before reforming in 2009 and embarking on "The Neverending World Tour". Their studio albums from 1986–2001 were re-mastered and re-released in September 2009, featuring previously released bonus tracks. Eighth studio album Charm School came in 2011, with Travelling following a year later. Their tenth and final studio album, Good Karma, was issued in 2016. A thirtieth anniversary edition of Look Sharp! was released in 2018, containing a bonus disc of demos. Fredriksson died in 2019 as a result of complications stemming from her 2002 cancer diagnosis. The band released an album of outtakes titled Bag of Trix on the first anniversary of her death; it was released in dedication to her.

Albums

Studio albums

Compilation albums

Box sets

Singles

1980s

1990s

2000s

2010s

2020s

Promotional singles

Other charted songs

Videography

Video albums

Music videos

Notes

References
Sources
The Look for Roxette - Worldwide discography
Roxette's official website (Click on discography)
Citations

Discographies of Swedish artists
Pop music group discographies
Discography